BLF may refer to:

 Bangladesh Liberation Front, also called Mujib Bahini
 Baluch Liberation Front
 Billboard Liberation Front
 Biographical Dictionary of Finland abbreviated BLF in Swedish from Biografiskt lexikon för Finland
 British Lung Foundation
 Brotherhood of Locomotive Firemen, forerunner of the Brotherhood of Locomotive Firemen and Enginemen in North America
 Bruce Lee Foundation
 Builders Labourers Federation in Australia
 Mercer County Airport (West Virginia); IATA airport code BLF
 Buol language of Indonesia (ISO code: blf)
 Black First Land First a pan-Africanist and revolutionary socialist political party in South Africa
 Blf, short for "Bluff"; a Street suffix as used in the US